is a railway station in Ōita City, Ōita Prefecture, Japan. It is operated by JR Kyushu and is on the Hōhi Main Line.

Lines

Layout 
The station consists of an island platform serving two tracks. The station building is an old wooden structure and houses a waiting area, a staffed ticket window, a SUGOCA charge machine and a SUGOCA card reader. Access to the island platform is by means of a footbridge.

Management of the station has been outsourced to the JR Kyushu Tetsudou Eigyou Co., a wholly owned subsidiary of JR Kyushu specialising in station services. It staffs the ticket booth which is equipped with a POS machine but does not have a Midori no Madoguchi facility.

Adjacent stations

Due to earthquake damage on the Hōhi Main Line, the Aso Boy! From April 2017, the Aso Boy! began operating on an alternative route from  through Ōita to Aso.

History
On 2 December 1928, the entire track from Kumamoto through Nakahanda to Ōita was designated as the Hōhi Main Line. With the privatization of Japanese National Railways (JNR), the successor of JGR, on 1 April 1987, Takio came under the control of JR Kyushu.

In September 2017, Typhoon Talim (Typhoon 18) damaged the Hōhi Main Line at several locations. Services between Aso and Nakahanda were suspended and replaced by bus services. Rail services were resumed on 2 October 2017.

JR Kyushu had planned to convert Nakahanda (with several other stations in Ōita City) into an unstaffed, remotely-managed "Smart Support Station" by 17 March 2018 but after opposition from users, this was postponed, pending works to improve accessibility.

Passenger statistics
In fiscal 2016, the station was used by an average of 950 passengers daily (boarding passengers only), and it ranked 172nd among the busiest stations of JR Kyushu.

See also
List of railway stations in Japan

References

External links
Nakahanda (JR Kyushu)

Railway stations in Ōita Prefecture
Railway stations in Japan opened in 1914
Ōita (city)